Blastococcus is a Gram-positive, coccoid and aerobic genus of bacteria from the family of Geodermatophilaceae.

References

Further reading 
 
 
 
 

 

Actinomycetia
Bacteria genera